In mathematics, the n-th cabtaxi number, typically denoted Cabtaxi(n), is defined as the smallest positive integer that can be written as the sum of two positive or negative or 0 cubes in n ways. Such numbers exist for all n, which follows from the analogous result for taxicab numbers.

Known cabtaxi numbers 
Only 10 cabtaxi numbers are known :

History 
Cabtaxi(5), Cabtaxi(6) and Cabtaxi(7) were found by Randall L. Rathbun; Cabtaxi(8) was found by Daniel J. Bernstein. Cabtaxi(9) was found by Duncan Moore, using Bernstein's method. Cabtaxi(10) was first reported as an upper bound by Christian Boyer in 2006 and verified as Cabtaxi(10) by Uwe Hollerbach and reported on the NMBRTHRY mailing list on May 16, 2008.

See also 

 Taxicab number
 Generalized taxicab number

External links 

 Announcement of Cabtaxi(9)
 Announcement of Cabtaxi(10)
 Cabtaxi at Euler

Number theory